ChaalBaaz is a 1989 Indian Hindi-language slapstick film directed by Pankaj Parashar and written by Rajesh Mazumdar and Kamlesh Pandey. It stars Sridevi in dual roles, with Sunny Deol and Rajinikanth. The film revolves around twin sisters Anju and Manju, who get separated at birth. Anju lives with her malicious uncle who plans to seize her property and traumatizes her by beating. On the other hand, Manju grows up amidst a slum environment and acquires tomboy characters.

The film was loosely an adaptation of the film Seeta Aur Geeta and had its story written by Rajesh Mazumdar. It was produced by A. Poorna Chandra Rao under the Lakshmi Productions banner. The duo Laxmikant–Pyarelal composed the soundtrack with lyrics penned by Anand Bakshi.  Manmohan Singh handled the cinematography while Afaque Hussain served as the editor.

Upon its release, ChaalBaaz was well received by critics and audiences alike, and emerged a commercial success, eventually becoming the fifth-highest-grossing film of 1989. Among the elements of the movie that were highly appreciated included the film's story, music and Sridevi's performance in the dual role, which is considered to be one of her best. At the 35th Filmfare Awards, the film received three nominations and won two awards: Best Actress (Sridevi) and Best Choreographer (Saroj Khan). It was remade in Kannada as Rani Maharani (1990) and in Odia as Ganga Jamuna (1993).

Plot 
Born as twin sisters, Anju (Sridevi) and Manju (Sridevi) are separated immediately after birth thanks to their mentally handicapped nanny (Aruna Irani). Anju ends up with her uncle Tribhuvan (Anupam Kher) and aunt Amba (Rohini Hattangadi), while Manju is raised in a slum environment. Their parents were killed in a car accident orchestrated by Tribhuvan. However, in their will, they declare that their daughters will inherit their wealth once  the twins turn 21. This results in Tribhuvan and Amba bringing Anju up as a coy and easily frightened girl, merely keeping her alive so she can sign off the property in their name. The house servant Daddu (Annu Kapoor), Anju's younger brother Raja (Aftab Shivdasani) and a pet dog sympathize with her plight.

Anju likes classical dance and is unable to resist the urge to dance whenever she hears Indian classical music. On his birthday, Tribhuvan hosts a grand party. Among the several guests attending is his friend Vishwanath (Saeed Jaffrey), who is generally kind towards Anju. When Indian classical music plays at the party, Anju is unable to resist and bursts out dancing but ends up accidentally slapping Tribhuvan. Although calm at the party, he beats Anju mercilessly with a whip the next day.

On the other hand, Manju grows up in a slum as a happy-go-lucky and street smart stage dancer. She spends her days tricking people in the village to forgo her loans and is childhood friends with her neighbor and taxi driver Jaggu (Rajnikanth). One night she crashes into a bar to drink beer where she meets and flirts with Suraj (Sunny Deol), Viswanath's son. Suraj soon falls for her. Vishwanath has been pestering Suraj to get married for a while now and one day, when he shows him Anju's photo as a prospective marriage offer, he agrees, mistaking her to be Manju. When they visit Tribhuvan's place with their offer, Anju doesn't recognize Suraj and has a panic attack (courtesy of the injections given to her by Amba), which scare Suraj and Vishwanath away.

The reason Tribhuvan and Amba refuse to attend to marriage offers for Anju is because they want to get her married to Amba's brother Batuknath Lallanprasad Maalpani a.k.a. Balma (Shakti Kapoor). They call Balma to live with them, who soon begins harassing Anju and kills her pet dog when he leaps to her defense. Terrified at the turn of events, Anju runs away from home. On her way, she is harassed by strangers until Suraj saves her. That same day, Manju has a fight with Jaggu and she sets off on her own path. In a twist of fate, their paths end up crossing and while the two never meet, they end up exchanging places. Thus, an injured Suraj is brought to Anju's house by Manju, while Anju ends up at Manju's slum. Manju falls in love with Suraj.

Manju is easily able to assert control over Tribhuvan, Amba and Balma. While the trio mistake her for Anju and assume her to be weak, Manju surprises them by displaying strength and aggression and has them under control. Meanwhile, Anju starts getting close to Jaggu, who starts falling for the new "Manju". He proposes marriage to her, to which she agrees. Suraj sees Anju with Jaggu and thinks Manju is two-timing them and breaks up with her.

The two sisters live their life comfortably until one day, Balma spots Anju at Manju's place and deduces that the one in their house is her twin sister Manju. He hatches a plan and kidnaps Anju, taking her to a bungalow at Alibaug. One of Jaggu's friends overhears Balma speaking to Tribhuvan on the phone and informs Manju, Suraj and Jaggu, who finally understand what's going on. They arrive at the bungalow where Tribhuvan forces Anju to drink poison and also has their nanny captive. Suraj, Manju and Jaggu fight Tribhuvan's goons and save Anju, who finally gets to share a tender moment with Manju. She is taken to the hospital and survives.

Finally, Suraj marries Manju while Jaggu end up with Anju and they live happily ever after. They are both blessed with twin girls that are born on the same day.

Cast
 Sunny Deol as Suraj Prajapati
Rajinikanth as  Jackie "Jaggu" Pandyekar
Sridevi as Anju Pandyekar and Manju Prajapati (twin sisters)
Anupam Kher as Tribhuvan Kushwaha
Rohini Hattangadi as Amba Kushwaha
Annu Kapoor as Dayal "Dadda" Sharma
Saeed Jaffrey as Vishwanath Prajapati
Shakti Kapoor as Batuknath Lalanprasad Maalpani (Balma)
Aruna Irani as Madhumati
Kader Khan as Blind Beggar (Special Appearance)
Aftab Shivdasani as Raju (Anju & Manju's brother)
Johnny Lever as Tantrik Johnny Baba (Special Appearance)
Ajay Wadhavkar as Bank Manager (Uncredited)

Production

Development
During the processing of Jalwa (1987) at Prasad studios in Chennai, eminent producer and director L. V. Prasad happened to see the film and liked it. He told [producer] A. Poorna Chandra Rao to get Pankuj Parashar to make a stylish film for him. When Rao approached Pankuj, he expressed his desire to make a film with Sridevi, who was popular at that time, owing to the success of Mr. India (1987). To this, Rao readily agreed. Rao enquired of Pankuj if he had a subject in mind, to which Pankuj promptly said that they would remake Seeta Aur Geeta (1972). When Pankuj met Sridevi and she asked for the script, he narrated to her the plot of Seeta Aur Geeta which she liked and communicated her willingness to be a part of the film to Rao in Telugu. According to Pankuj, while writing the screenplay, along with Kamlesh Pandey, he used to call Kamal Haasan everyday for tips, since they were friends. Haasan acted as a guide on ChaalBaaz, and advised Pankuj not to deviate from the plot of  Seeta Aur Geeta. He also assured Pankuj that Sridevi would perform differently from Hema Malini.

Casting
Anil Kapoor was initially approached for one of the male leads. But he turned down the offer, fearing that Sridevi's performance in dual role would overshadow his part. Later, Rajinikanth and Sunny Deol were selected for the respective roles. The reason behind Deol accepting the film was that, his father Dharmendra had done a similar role in Seeta Aur Geeta (1972) and he wanted people to remember them for that. Rohini Hattangadi, who had previously played a character inspired by [Sridevi] in Jalwa, was cast as Anju's cruel aunt. Anupam Kher was cast as Tribhuvan, one of his memorable works as an antagonist. Annu Kapoor was cast in the role of the servant Daddu, a character double of his age at that time while Aftab Shivdasani appeared as a child artist. ChaalBaaz marked Sridevi's first dual role film in Hindi cinema, the others being Lamhe and Khuda Gawah. Speaking about her role, she said that she loved enacting Manju's character as a prankster, while also revealing that she had the greatest time shooting for ChaalBaaz and further she loved the song "Na Jaane Kahan Se Aayi Hai".

Filming
Principal photography took place primarily in Mumbai, being handled by Manmohan Singh. Sridevi herself was very closely related with the production. Acting upon her suggestion, Pankuj decided to change the customes every four lines and according separately built sets were prepared for the song "Mera Bemar Tera Dil".

Reception and legacy
Filmfare ranked Sridevi's performance in Chaalbaaz 4th in its list of "80 Iconic Performances of Hindi Cinema" stating that "Sridevi's penchant for giggles and her ability to look distinctly tearful when required polishes these performances to perfection. Hell, she made Sunny Deol and Rajnikant look like sidekicks in the film". The Times of India article "Bollywood's Hit Double Roles" stated: "Sridevi's performance rocked the box office". Rediff featured the film in its countdown of "25 Best Double Roles in Bollywood" saying: "What you don't realize until you have seen ChaalBaaz is just how incredible Sridevi is at depicting both ends of the spectrum" and that the film "cemented her position as an actress with a killer comic timing". Speaking to The Indian Express about Sridevi's act in ChaalBaaz, the director Pankaj Parashar said "She proved her range with the movie and after that she got lots of offers which saw her in a double role". Her slapstick rain dance "Na jaane kahan se aayi hai" became a big hit with The Times of India describing it as a "Sridevi classic where she simply looked wow with her chirpy expressions and rain drops kissing her cheeks". The song ultimately led to choreographer Saroj Khan's winning the Filmfare Award for Best Choreography.

Reboot
In 2021, a reboot titled ChaalBaaz in London was announced by T-Series with the same director and Shraddha Kapoor in the lead dual role; the film was later put on hold.

Music 
Music composer duo Laxmikant–Pyarelal composed the film's score with lyrics by Anand Bakshi. The music was produced by Zee Music Company. The film's songs were very well received with some, such as "Na Jaane Kahan Se Aayi Hai" going on to become huge hits and classics.

Soundtrack

Awards

References

External links 
 

1989 films
1990s Hindi-language films
1991 films
Remakes of Indian films
Films scored by Laxmikant–Pyarelal
Twins in Indian films
1980s Hindi-language films
Hindi films remade in other languages
Films directed by Pankuj Parashar